Port Said American School is a school, founded in 2000, in the suburbs of Greater Cairo, Egypt. It is a division of the Port Said Language Schools. The school campus is situated in Zamalek. It is accredited by AdvancEd, receiving its accreditation on 2001.

References 

 Reference in Al Ahram Digital 
 Reference in Al Ahram Scientific Magazine 
 Reference in Al Ahram Scientific 
 Reference in Nature Soapbox Blog 
 Reference in Radar News 

Schools in Cairo
American international schools in Egypt
International schools in Egypt
International Baccalaureate schools in Egypt
Educational institutions established in 2000
2000 establishments in Egypt